is a Buddhist temple of the Shingon Buzan Sect located in Yamakura, Katori, Chiba Prefecture. The temple is one of two temples in Katori with the same name, the other being Makinosan Kanpuku-ji.

History
Kanpuku-ji was, by legend, founded b a priest named Enton in 811. The famed Kūkai (774 – 835), the founder of Shingon Buddhism,  visited the region in 814AD and found that residents of the area were suffering from infectious diseases. The residents offered Kūkai salmon from the nearby Kuri River and were suddenly cured. The festival of the temple, held on 7 October annually, includes the offering of a raw salmon during a Buddhist service. The temple obtained the right to use the imperial Chrysanthemum crest  from Emperor Saga (786-842), and for its priests to wear purple robes as a mark of its status.  

Through most of its history, under the Shinbutsu-shūgō philosophy, Kanpuku-ji served as an auxiliary temple to the nearby Yamakura Shrine. After the Meiji Restoration. In 1871, under the shinbutsu bunri movement, temples and shrines were formally separated. Buddhist objects were removed from the Yamakura Shrine and installed in Kanpuku-ji, a process that lasted into the early 20th century.

Structures
Mizuya, a roofed area with a water basin for hand washing
Kyakuden, reception hall
Kuri, monks' quarters
Kōdō, lecture hall
Nyōkyōsho, a place of offering of a Buddhist sutra

Order in Buddhist pilgrimage 
Kanpuku-ji is the 45th temple in the Kantō Hachijūhachikasho, a pilgrimage circuit of 88 Buddhist temples in the Kantō region of eastern Japan visited by, or associated with Kūkai.

Transportation
It can be reached by bus from Sawara Station or Omigawa Station on the JR East Narita Line.

See also 
 For an explanation of terms concerning Japanese Buddhism, Japanese Buddhist art, and Japanese Buddhist temple architecture, see the Glossary of Japanese Buddhism.

External links
第45番霊場 山倉山 観福寺
山倉大神　本殿（香取市

References

Religious organizations established in the 9th century
Buddhist temples in Chiba Prefecture
Shingon temples
Katori, Chiba